John Strutt may refer to:

 John Strutt (1727–1816), British Member of Parliament for Maldon
 John James Strutt, 2nd Baron Rayleigh (1796–1873) of the Barons Rayleigh
 John William Strutt, 3rd Baron Rayleigh (1842–1919), physicist and Nobel Prize winner
 John Arthur Strutt, 5th Baron Rayleigh (1908–1988) of the Barons Rayleigh
 John Gerald Strutt, 6th Baron Rayleigh (born 1960) of the Barons Rayleigh

See also
 John Strutt Peyton (1786–1838), captain in the British Navy, Knight Commander of the Royal Guelphic Order